The Lord's Chosen Charismatic Revival Movement (popularly called The Lord's Chosen) is a Nigerian Christian megachurch founded by Lazarus Muoka. The church which has its headquarters located along the Oshodi - Apapa Expressway in Surulere local government area of Lagos State started with a few people and went on to experience rapid growth with over 300,000 branches all over the world.

History
In 1994, Lazarus Muoka claimed to have had a vision from God instructing him to leave his former church to form what is now known as The Lord's Chosen Charismatic Revival Movement. The church which was founded on 23 December 2002 commenced service on 24 December 2002 with a few pioneer members in a rented apartment at Ilasamaja, a town in Mushin, Lagos.

Due to the increase in new converts in a short period, the church was moved to its present location in Ijeshatedo on a sixty plot of land which can contain over 1,000,000 members in a service.

Mission and Vision
The church is anchored upon a “Three Fold Vision” as follows:
 Grass root revival all over the world. (Mark 16:15-17)
 Revival of the apostolic Christian experiences among the body of Christ. (1 Peter 2:9-10)
 Revival of Heavenly consciousness in the Body of Christ- Heaven at last. (Matthew 6:33)

The church also has a mandate to win  10 Billion Souls for Christ.

Controversy
It was reported in the media that the Lagos State Government shut down the church for allegedly "defacing and constituting environmental nuisance to its environment". The management of the church denied the reports.

References

External links

Christian organizations established in 2002
Pentecostal denominations
Churches in Lagos
Evangelical megachurches in Nigeria